MYSC Lady Blues is an American women's soccer team, founded in 2007. The team is a member of the Women's Premier Soccer League, the third tier of women's soccer in the United States and Canada. The team plays in the Midwest Conference.

The team plays its home games at Otto Breitenbach Stadium in Middleton, Wisconsin, 10 miles north-west of downtown Madison. The club's colors are white and sky blue.

Players

Current roster

Notable former players
The following former players have played at the senior international and/or professional level:
 Sylvia Gee

Year-by-year

Honors
 WPSL Midwest Conference Champions 2008

Competition history

Coaches
  Ben John 2008–present

Stadia
 Otto Breitenbach Stadium, Middleton, Wisconsin 2008–present

Average attendance

External links
 Official Site
 WPSL MYSC Lady Blues page

Women's Premier Soccer League teams
Women's soccer clubs in the United States
Soccer clubs in Wisconsin
2007 establishments in Wisconsin